Douglas "Doug" Armati (born 1950) is an Australian writer, researcher, consultant, business development executive and technical diplomat.

Doug Armati undertook research work on digital copyright issues at Murdoch University in Western Australia in 1990–91 before taking a role in international efforts to standardize the identification of digital objects.

After a speech on the importance and potential economic benefits of uniform approach to identification of digitized copyright content to the International Association of Scientific, Technical, and Medical Publishers at the Frankfurt Book Fair in October 1994 he wrote two pivotal reports in 1995 – the first for the STM group on Information Identification and the second for the Association of American Publishers on Uniform File Identifiers. Armati's work for these global publishing bodies was an important catalyst for the birth of the Digital Object Identifier Foundation.

His 1996 speech at the joint ICSU/UNESCO Electronic Publishing in Science conference in Paris on "Tools and standards for protection, control and archiving" and his book later that year on "Intellectual Property in Electronic Environments" both helped frame the legal, scientific and technical debate in the emerging field of Digital Rights Management. Armati was also part of the digital copyright experts group that worked closely with the World Intellectual Property Organization in the period leading up to the ratification of the WIPO Copyright Treaty in December 1996.

In 1996 Armati joined InterTrust Technologies, the leading company in the then nascent field of Digital Rights Management, where he was a member of the leadership group through the company's 1999 IPO until its sale to Sony and Philips in early 2003.

During his time with InterTrust, Armati was also active in international standards groups, having been a vice-chairman of the Recording Industry Association of America's international Secure Digital Music Initiative, a board member of the Open eBook Forum (now the International Digital Publishing Forum) and a significant contributor to the Moving Picture Experts Group (MPEG), particularly in the development of a standard for the management and protection of intellectual property in MPEG-4, MPEG-7 and MPEG-21.

References
 (1991) Copyright: The Fragile Estate? Special Project in Intellectual Property, Murdoch University, Perth, 1991.
 (1994) A Uniform Approach to Identification of Digitized Copyright Content? STM Newsletter 95, November 1994, transcript of paper delivered at 26th STM General Assembly, Frankfurt, October 1994. 
 (1994) Rights on the Line: A Uniform Approach to Data Content Identification? Speech to the Annual General Assembly and Update Meeting of the European Information Industry Association (EIIA), London, December 1994.
 (1995) Information Identification, report to the STM International Group of Scientific Technical and Medical Publishers Task Force on Information Identifiers and Metering Systems in the Electronic Environment, Amersfoort, The Netherlands, March 1995.
 (1995) Information Identification: Towards a Universal System. Address to The Information Networking Alliance of BIC, SCONUL and UCISA Seminar, Tightening the Net: Protecting Intellectual Property on the Information Networks, London, May 1995.
 (1995) The Commercial Realities of Information Transaction Management. Address to the AIC Trading Information on the Networks conference, London, July 1995.
 (1995) Uniform File Identifiers, Report to the Association of American Publishers, Commissioned by the AAP Enabling Technologies Committee, Washington, October 1995.
 (1995–96) New European and Japanese Developments in Electronic Information Commerce and Digital Publishing, Monthly Reports prepared for Copyright Clearance Center, Inc., Woodbridge, UK.
 (1995–96) Electronic Information, monthly newsletter, Technology Watch series, Cambridge Market Intelligence, London Volumes 1 and 2. 
 (1996) Tools and standards for protection, control and archiving, in Electronic Publishing in Science, Proceedings of the Joint ISCU/UNESCO Expert Conference, Paris, February 1996, UNESCO, Paris, pp25–35. 
 (1996) Changing Information Relationships in a Digital Environment, Address to Global Roundtable on the Information Society, Templeton College, Oxford, June 1996.
 (1996) Intellectual Property in Electronic Environments, Cambridge Market Intelligence, monograph, 285pp, London, 1996. 
 (1996) Tools and Standards for Protection, Control and Presentation of Data, Proceedings Electronic Commerce for Content, Forum on Technology-Based Intellectual Property Management, Volume 2, August 1996, Kahin, B. and Arms, K. (eds), Interactive Multimedia Association, Annapolis. pp19–33
 (1996) The New Libraries, Global, Local, Individual in Laboratory of the social sciences: a virtual future: a celebration of the first one hundred years of the British Library of Political and Economic Science, British Library of Political and Economic Science, London. Brindley, L. (ed.) pp112–115. 
 (1996) Keeping Track of Copyright in the Electronic Wilderness, Logos: Journal of the World Publishing Community, Vol 7, No 4, pp268–272. 
 (1997) Intellectual property issues relating to electronic delivery on networks: rights management as an end-to-end process, 7th International European Business Information Conference Proceedings, Berlin, March 1997. TFPL, London. 
 (1997) Rights Management in Electronic Environments in Electronic Publishing for Physics and Astronomy, Heck, A. (ed.) reprinted from Astrophysics and Space Science Volume 247, Nos. 1–2, pp133–144, Kluwer, Dordecht. 
 (1997) Armati, D., van Wie, D. and Weber, R., Intellectual Property Rights Management for MPEG-4: The InterTrust Commerce Architecture, ISO/IEC JTC1/SC29/WG11 M2509, Stockholm, July 1997.
 (1998) The InterTrust OPIMA Solution: Open Content Management and Protection with the InterTrust Commerce Architecture, submission to OPIMA, Sunnyvale, September 1998.
 (1999) Protecting and Managing Music on First Generation Portable Devices, InterTrust Technologies Corporation submission to Secure Digital Music Initiative-Portable Devices Working Group, Sunnyvale, 1999.
 (2000) Armati, D., Lacy, J. and Shamoon, T., Flexible and Robust IPMP Solutions Using the MPEG-4 IPMP Hooks, ISO/IEC JTC1/SC29/WG11 M6443, La Baule, October 2000.

External links
Intellectual Property in Electronic Environments
World Intellectual Property Organization
International Council for Science
UNESCO
DOI Foundation
International Digital Publishing Forum
MPEG 

1950 births
Living people
Australian non-fiction writers
People educated at Barker College